Daniel Kaplan (born 6 March 1973) is a retired Czech football midfielder.

References

1969 births
Living people
Czech footballers
SK Slavia Prague players
FC Hradec Králové players
Czech First League players
Association football midfielders